Baroness Erzsébet Czobor de Czoborszentmihály (1572 – 31 March 1626) was the second wife of Palatine György Thurzó.

Biography
Her parents were Imre Czobor, who served as Palatinal Governor of Hungary between 1572 and 1581, and his third wife, Borbála Perényi de Perény.

Thurzó and Erzsébet married on 2 February 1592 in Sasvár (today part of Šaštín-Stráže, Slovakia). They had several children:

János, died young
Borbála, she married twice:
30 September 1612: Count Kristóf Erdődy de Monyorókerék et Monoszló (d. 1621)
29 January 1629 (Zólyom): Count János Draskovich de Trakostyán, Palatine of Hungary (1646–1648)
Ilona, married to Count Gáspár Illésházy (d. 1648)
Imre (11 September 1598 – 19 October 1621), Perpetual Ispán (Count; comes) of Árva County and Rector of the University of Wittenberg (1616–1621), the last male member of the Thurzó family
Mária, married to Mihály Vízkelethy in 1618
Katalin (d. 1647), married to Baron István Thököly de Késmárk (1581–1651) in 1620, paternal grandmother of Count Imre Thököly
Anna, married to Baron János Szunyogh de Jeszenicze et Budatin (d. 1641) in 1622
Erzsébet

References

Sources
 Miklós Kubinyi: Bethlenfalvi gróf Thurzó Imre 1598–1621, Budapest, Méhner Vilmos kiadása, 1888

1572 births
1621 deaths
Hungarian nobility
Erzsebet